The 1930 season was the Chicago Bears' 11th in the National Football League. The team was able to improve on their 4–9–2 record from 1929 and finished with a 9–4–1 record under first-year head coach Ralph Jones. Jones, a former player, led the team to recover from its ninth-place finish to a respectable third-place finish. The season started badly with a 1–2–1 record over the first four games, the only win coming against the hapless Minneapolis Redjackets. After splitting games five and six, the Bears got their winning ways back, finishing the season with 5 straight wins and 7 wins in their last 8 games. The only loss those last 8 games was to eventual champion Green Bay. The secret to the Bears' success was new talent in the backfield. All-American and rookie Bronko Nagurski starred at fullback while living legend Red Grange starred at tailback. These two future Hall of Famers combined for 13 touchdowns overall. Luke Johnsos, in his second year, also starred at the end. The makings of future championships were in place.

Future Hall of Fame players
Red Grange, back
Link Lyman, tackle
Bronko Nagurski, fullback/tackle (rookie from University of Minnesota)
George Trafton, center

Other leading players
Carl Brumbaugh, quarterback (rookie from University of Florida)
Garland Grange, end
Luke Johnsos, end
William Senn, back
Joe Sternaman, quarterback
Laurie Walquist, quarterback

Players departed from 1929
Paddy Driscoll, back (retired)
George Halas, end (retired)
Joe Kopcha, guard (temporarily left team)

Schedule

Standings

References

Chicago Bears
Chicago Bears seasons
Chicago Bears